Bazil Ashmawy, commonly known as Baz Ashmawy, is an Irish radio and television personality, whose TV show 50 Ways to Kill Your Mammy won the International Emmy Award for Best Non-Scripted Entertainment award. In summer 2017, he hosted That Baz Thing on RTÉ Radio One. Ashmawy co-hosted Weekend Breakfast with Baz & Lucy on RTÉ 2fm in 2010, and co-presented the 2008 reality show Fáilte Towers on RTÉ One, as well as the popular travel show How Low Can You Go on RTÉ Two. In 2018 he began presenting ITV's new singing show – Change Your Tune Aine

Early life
According to an article in The Nationalist (Carlow), Ashmawy's mother Nancy is from Ballycoog, Ballycoog, Avoca, County Wicklow although Ashmawy was born in Libya and is part-Egyptian. He moved to Ireland at age eight and grew up in the Dublin suburb of Churchtown and attended CUS Leeson Street for a period of time.

Career
Ashmawy is best known for 50 Ways to Kill Your Mammy which was first broadcast on Sky 1. The show is based on Baz inserting his 71-year-old mother Nancy into various dare-devil situations, and documenting her typical Irish mammy reactions to the situations.

In November 2015 50 Ways to Kill Your Mammy won the Best Non-Scripted Entertainment award at the 2015 International Emmy Awards.

Prior to that, Ashmawy was on the popular RTÉ Two travel show, How Low Can You Go? where he appeared with co-presenters Mark O'Neill and Michael Hayes.  In remarking on his experiences with that show, Ashmawy said that he loved Las Vegas where he received a lap dance from (as he describes) 'a former hooker who looked like she was in her late 50s' and said of his experiences on the set of a porn movie in California that 'We saw things there that will be in our minds for a very long time.'

Ashmawy is also a sports fan who tried his skill at GAA management on the RTÉ show Celebrity Bainisteoir. According to The Irish Times, Ashmawy managed managing his team while wearing 'nicely polished footwear'. When asked in an RTÉ Sport interview who he would like to see win the 2007 Rugby World Cup, Ashmawy joked that he was 'not going for the patriotic 'Go Ireland' I'd have to say New Zealand...typical. How boring is that. Think I've made myself feel a little sick there saying that. I'm going back....'GO IRELAND!'

He appeared in Jason Byrne's award-winning prank series Anonymous. He later appeared numerous times on RTÉ One's flagship travel show No Frontiers before venturing into his own solo project Baz's Culture Clash on RTÉ Two. The series saw him travelling. His next project Baz's Extreme Worlds aired on 10 May 2010.

In addition to appearing on as television host, Ashmawy is an actor who has appeared in television dramas and other programmes. He has also appeared in a plays and short films. Although he says that comedy comes naturally to him, his dramaturgical background has led him to productions of classical theatre and the works of Shakespeare.

In April 2015, Ashmawy hosted the Sky 1 quiz show "Fanatics" where fanatics of various things (e.g. Doctor Who) are tested on their knowledge of these things

50 Ways to Kill Your Mammy
The series was born after Ashmawy's mum and co-star Nancy, 72, announced that she wanted to do a skydive. The first series was one of the most watched programmes on Sky 1 in Ireland in 2014; season 2 was considered as delightful as the first.

The show has been licensed by Sky Vision into over 150 territories worldwide, including Canada, Australia, China, and the Middle-East. Local versions of the show have been produced in a number of key territories, including Denmark (two series), Holland and Belgium with several countries picking up the 50 Way to Kill your Mammy format, making this Sky Vision's most successful factual entertainment property to date.

In November 2015 50 Ways to Kill Your Mammy won the Best Non-Scripted Entertainment award at the 2015 International Emmy Awards.

In 2016, Sky 1 aired the 3rd season of the show in a new twist to the show's format, where four new Mammies joined Baz and Nancy on their travels, changing the show to be known as 50 Ways to Kill Your Mammies.

On 12 October 2017, Ashmawy announced on Twitter that he and Nancy would be filming a one off Christmas special broadcast exclusively on RTÉ Ireland. This was followed, on 12 November, by a series of Snapchat videos of Nancy, Baz and the production crew at Dublin airport waiting to fly out to Rome for filming.

Radio
In July 2017, Ashmawy hosted his radio show That Baz Thing on RTÉ Radio One. On his show he interviewed different 3 guests every week as he explores a broad range of issues, including parenting, health, happiness and relationships.

Ashmawy co-hosted Weekend Breakfast with Baz & Lucy on RTÉ 2fm with Lucy Kennedy for 2 years.

Personal life
He has two daughters Hanna and Mahy with Tanja Evans whom he met in 2006. He is also stepfather to Tanja's four other kids from a previous relationship (Charlotte, Harry, Jake and Amelia). One of his lungs collapsed on a transatlantic flight and he underwent double-lung surgery.

Legal history
On 4 March 2011, Ashmawy's employer, Raidió Teilifís Éireann, suspended Mr. Ashmawy for a period of one month following a drink driving incident the previous weekend. His driving licence was suspended for two years as a result of the arrest and conviction

References

External links

1975 births
20th-century Irish people
21st-century Irish people
Living people
Irish people of Egyptian descent
RTÉ 2fm presenters
RTÉ television presenters
People educated at Catholic University School
People from Churchtown, Dublin